125th Street, co-named Martin Luther King Jr. Boulevard, is a two-way street that runs east–west in the New York City borough of Manhattan, from First Avenue on the east to Marginal Street, a service road for the Henry Hudson Parkway along the Hudson River in the west. It is often considered to be the "Main Street" of Harlem.

Notable buildings along 125th Street include the Apollo Theater, the Adam Clayton Powell Jr. State Office Building, the Hotel Theresa, the Studio Museum in Harlem, the Mount Morris Bank Building, Harlem Commonwealth Council, the Harlem Children's Zone, the Church of St. Joseph of the Holy Family, and the former West End Theatre, now home to the La Gree Baptist Church.

History

Neighborhoods
The western part of the street runs diagonally between the neighborhoods of Manhattanville and Morningside Heights from the northwest from the West Harlem Piers and an interchange with the Henry Hudson Parkway at 130th Street. East of Morningside Avenue it runs east–west through central Harlem to Second Avenue, where a ramp connects it to the Robert F. Kennedy (Triborough) Bridge. However, 125th Street continues to First Avenue, where it connects to the southbound FDR Drive and the Willis Avenue Bridge.

West of Convent Avenue, 125th Street was rerouted onto what was, prior to 1920, called Manhattan Street. What remains of the original alignment of 125th Street was renamed La Salle Street at that time. The remaining blocks run between Amsterdam Avenue and Claremont Avenue. The New York Times lamented the name changes, noting that the new names had "somewhat doubtful nomenclature", and that the City's "Aldermen like French names" but gave no rationale for the moves otherwise. A block of the original 125th Street in this area was de-mapped to make the super-blocks where the Grant Houses projects now exist.

A proposal to convert the street into a Trans-Harlem Expressway died when funds were diverted from the proposed 125th Street Hudson River bridge at the street's western end.

Beginning in the late 1990s, many sections of 125th Street have been gentrified and developed with such stores as MAC Cosmetics, Old Navy, H&M, CVS/pharmacy, and Magic Johnson Theaters. In collaboration with the community, the city has developed a plan for the 125th Street corridor focusing on reinforcing and building upon its strengths as an arts and cultural corridor.

Fault line

A rift in the crust runs along underneath this street from the East River to New Jersey and is known as the 125th Street Fault or the Manhattanville Fault. It is suspected to have caused a magnitude-5.2 earthquake in 1737, two smaller ones in 1981, and a 2.4 magnitude quake in 2001. The fault line skims across the top of Central Park and runs to Roosevelt Island to the southeast. It creates a fault valley deep enough to require the IRT Broadway–Seventh Avenue Line to use a trestle between 122nd and 135th Streets, even though the line goes underground at either end and remains at the same elevation above sea level throughout. Riverside Drive also crosses over the fault valley on a high viaduct.

Public transportation

The following New York City Subway stations are located at 125th Street (west to east):
 125th Street at Broadway serving the 
 125th Street at St. Nicholas Avenue serving the 
 125th Street at Lenox Avenue serving the 
 125th Street at Lexington Avenue serving the 

The following NYC Bus lines serve 125th Street:
  all serve 125th as crosstown lines.
  at Riverside Drive
  at St. Nicholas Avenue
  at Frederick Douglass Boulevard
  at Adam Clayton Powell Jr. Boulevard (7th Avenue)
  at Lenox Avenue
  at Madison Avenue (northbound) and Fifth Avenue (southbound)
  at Park Avenue (southbound) and Third Avenue (northbound)
  at Lexington Avenue (southbound) and Third Avenue (northbound)
  at Lexington Avenue (eastbound)
  at Second Avenue (southbound) and First Avenue (northbound)

Metro-North Railroad's Harlem–125th Street station is located at the street's intersection with Park Avenue.

The planned second phase of the Second Avenue Subway, continuing north from the 116th Street station, will turn westward onto 125th Street, terminating at a station at Lexington Avenue. The new station would connect to the Metro-North and preexisting Lexington Avenue subway stations there.

Gallery

Notable occupants
As of 2011, former president Bill Clinton maintains an office on 125th Street.

In popular culture
 The intersection of 125th and Lexington Avenue is the location where Lou Reed buys heroin on the Velvet Underground's "I'm Waiting for the Man" from their seminal 1967 debut album, The Velvet Underground & Nico.
 Small Talk at 125th and Lenox (1970) is an album by Gil Scott-Heron.

References
Notes

External links

Harlem
125